The Peter and Catharine Whyte Hut, also known as the Peyto Hut, is an alpine hut located on the northern tip of the Wapta Icefield in Banff National Park.  It is nicknamed the Peyto hut due to its proximity on the Peyto Glacier.  The hut is maintained by the Alpine Club of Canada.

The hut sleeps 18 in the summer and 16 in the winter.  It is equipped with propane powered lamps and stovetop.  There is a single outdoor drum toilet at this facility.

Hut access requires approximately 6 to 8 hours of travel  including at least an hour of glacier travel to get to from Peyto Lake, or 6 to 8 hours of glacier travel from the Bow Hut.

Nearby
 Peyto Lake
 Peyto Glacier
 Wapta Icefield
 Bow Hut
 R.J. Ritchie Hut, (Balfour Hut)

References

Mountain huts in Canada
Buildings and structures in Banff National Park